The Butch Factor: What Kind of Man Are You? is a 2009 documentary film produced and directed by American director Christopher Hines through his own production company Rogue Culture Inc. The film, narrated by Hines, was filmed at various locations including Atlanta, Georgia, Los Angeles, San Francisco and Guerneville, California, and Seattle, Washington, and was shown at gay and documentary festivals. The television premiere was April 17, 2010, on the gay channel Logo.

Christopher Hines followed up The Butch Factor with the documentary The Adonis Factor (2010).

Synopsis
The documentary tackles meanings of masculinity in gay men and culture through interviews with a great number of diverse gay men mixed with fast-paced sometimes archival tour of diverse groups of gay males from 1970s to contemporary times, with "eye candy" shots of men as well as analytical and expert presentations from writers, teachers, psychologists about their views of gay culture, masculinity, fetishism, discrimination, etc. It discusses how gay "butch" men often feel alone in their effort to integrate in general gay life as masculine males. Discussions include the butch gay stereotypes of leather men, bears, rodeo riders, muscle men, construction workers, truck drivers, policemen, sportsmen, and others, intertwined with questions of homophobia, stereotyping, metrosexuality, effeminacy, and fashion.

Cast
(All appearing as themselves)
Christopher Hines as Narrator
J. Wesley Adams (credited as Wes Adams)
David Aguilar
H.T. Bennett
Jackson Bowman
Ellen Brin
Junior Buendia
Brent Calderwood
Vincent Calvarese (San Francisco Sheriff)
John Campbell
Gregory Cason
Eric Chinchilla
Dan Cullinane
Steven Daigle
Colin Daly
Durk Dehner
Allen Eggman
Brian Garrison
Larry Gross
Mike Gunn
Keith Harris 
Jason Hefley (commissioner of the San Diego American Flag Football League and construction worker)
Trevor Hoppe
Dalph Johnson
Doug Komlenic
Matt Laird
Harry Lit
Jaimes Loughrey
Jack Malebranche
Rich McMurray
Peter Nardi
Marcus Nunn
Chris Ohnesorge (credited as Chriso)
Wing Poon
Jim Reed
Kevin Reed
Don Romesburg—archivist
Cory Smith
Mark Snyder
Kelly Stahr
Steve Sublet
Ron Wear
Wes Wilkinson
Frank Yanez
Bil Yoelin

Screenings
Frameline Film Festival - San Francisco
Austin Gay and Lesbian Film Festival
Reel Affirmations - Washington D.C.
Out on Film - Atlanta1
Image Out - Rochester
Pittsburgh Lesbian & Gay Film Festival
Tampa International Gay & Lesbian Film Festival
Image+Nation - Montreal
Seattle Lesbian and Gay Film Festival
Cinema Diverse-Palm Springs
Mezipatra - Prague
Les Gai Cine Mad - Madrid
Vancouver Queer Film Festival

References

External links

Facebook

2009 documentary films
2009 LGBT-related films
2009 films
American documentary films
American LGBT-related films
Documentary films about gay men
Gay masculinity
2000s English-language films
2000s American films